Orongoy (Orongo) is a rural locality (an ulus) in Ivolginsky District, Republic of Buryatia, Russia. The population was 1,760 as of 2010. There are 5 streets.

References 

Rural localities in Ivolginsky District